Ceramik City Chronicles is the debut studio album by Norwegian multi-instrumentalist Jarle Bernhoft.

Track listing

Personnel
 Jarle Bernhoft - vocals, guitar, synthesizer, beats

References

2009 debut albums
Jarle Bernhoft albums
Decca Records albums